Tales from the Loop is an alternative history science fiction tabletop role-playing game designed by Nils Hintze, based on the art of Simon Stålenhag. It was published in 2017 by Free League Publishing, the international arm of Swedish game and book publisher Fria Ligan AB, and Modiphius Entertainment. The game is built upon the Year Zero Engine created by Tomas Härenstam, who also served as the editor and project manager.

The role-playing game was originally a stretch goal on a Kickstarter campaign for publication of the art book, but was then further funded by a Kickstarter campaign by Fria Ligan AB, who surpassed their crowdfunding goal and raised a total of 3,745,896 kr from 5,600 backers.

The stand-alone expansion Things from the Flood, based on Stålenhag's art book of the same name, was also funded by a Kickstarter campaign, raising a total of 4,249,903 kr from 5,824 backers.

Play overview

Background 
Tales from the Loop has two settings available from the rulebook. The first setting is an alternative version of the Mälaren Islands, west of the Swedish capital of Stockholm. The second included setting, which was created from reaching a stretch goal on the Kickstarter, is in a city based on Boulder City, Nevada in America. There is a step-by-step guide for players to put their own hometowns into the game, which was included due to a stretch goal on Kickstarter being met. The chapter, called "Hometown Hack", appears in a supplementary book, Tales from the Loop: Our Friends The Machines & Other Mysteries.

In Tales from the Loop, a story that the players play through is called a Mystery. The players play as the Kids, a group of friends, aged 10-15, living in the late 1980s. In the Mysteries, the Kids encounter machines and creatures that have come to exist because of the Loop, a huge underground particle accelerator built in the late 1960s.

Game mechanics 
Tales from the Loop runs on 6 main principles that are meant to help the Gamemaster and players create the intended feeling and plot of the Mystery:

 Your Hometown is Full of Strange and Fantastic Things
 Everyday Life is Dull and Unforgiving
 Adults are Out of Reach and Out of Touch
 The Land of the Loop is Dangerous but The Kids Will Not Die
 The Game is Played Scene by Scene
 The World is Described Collaboratively

The Kids are characters created by the players. The game offers many options for the player to choose from, but the main categorization for a Kid is based on their Type, similar to how Classes work in Dungeons & Dragons. The types introduced in the game are:

 Bookworm
 Computer Geek
 Hick
 Jock
 Popular Kid
 Rocker
 Troublemaker
 Weirdo

Things from the Flood is a stand-alone game that can be used with new characters as well as characters brought over from earlier Tales from the Loop play. The mechanics remain much the same, except for two major differences: the player characters are slightly older, and death is a possible outcome.

Reception 
Shut Up & Sit Down praised Tales from the Loop for its comfortable, contemporary setting, simple rules that make the game easy to run, and the alternation between sci-fi and the kids' lives, while criticizing its Type system for characters, noting the usage of "hick" sounding derogatory and "suggested “Pride” for the Weirdo involved being homosexual–– the only mention of queerness in the entire game". Geek & Sundry named Tales from the Loop as 2017's best RPG release and praised Stålenhag's art, the collaborative nature between the GM and players, and the simplicity of running the game.

In a review of Tales from the Loop in Black Gate, Andrew Zimmerman Jones said "Though not based directly on an established franchise, it draws richly from elements of popular culture that will make it resonate with many players. The focus on narrative play also means it’s a good game for people who aren’t necessarily big into learning a ton of new rules."

See also 
Particle accelerators in popular culture
Neo-futurism
Cyberpunk derivatives
Shadowrun

References 

Alternate history role-playing games
American alternate history
Artificial intelligence in fiction
Boulder City, Nevada
ENnies winners
Fiction about robots
Kickstarter-funded tabletop games
Mälaren
Mecha role-playing games
Retrofuturism
Retro style
Role-playing games based on works
Role-playing games introduced in 2017
Science fiction role-playing games
Swedish science fiction
Swedish alternate history
Works set in the 1980s